The Lady of the Harem is a 1926 American silent adventure film directed by Raoul Walsh and written by James Elroy Flecker and James T. O'Donohoe. The film stars Ernest Torrence, William Collier, Jr., Greta Nissen, Louise Fazenda, George Beranger, Sôjin Kamiyama, and Frank Leigh. The film was released on November 1, 1926, by Paramount Pictures. It also had the alternative title The Golden Voyage.

Plot
As described in a film magazine review, the gold-greedy sultan in levying taxes seizes the daughter of one of his subjects in lieu of money and carries her to his harem. The youth she loves is captured while attempting her rescue, but a friend he has made in the royal city rescues him and the girl. In turn he is elevated to the ruling seat following the death of the tyrant.

Cast

Preservation
With no prints of The Lady of the Harem located in any film archives, it is a lost film.

References

External links

Still with 4 members of the harem

1926 films
American adventure films
1926 adventure films
Paramount Pictures films
Films directed by Raoul Walsh
American black-and-white films
American silent feature films
Lost American films
1926 lost films
Lost adventure films
1920s English-language films
1920s American films
Silent adventure films